Haugstad is a Norwegian surname. Notable people with the surname include:

Bjørn Haugstad (born 1969), Norwegian civil servant and politician
Eirik Haugstad (born 1994), Norwegian footballer
Phil Haugstad (1924–1998), American baseball player

Norwegian-language surnames